Tukey's Bridge is a bridge connecting the neighborhoods of Munjoy Hill and East Deering in Portland, Maine. It is part of Interstate 295, U.S. Route 1, and State Route 26.

History
Several bridges by the same name have existed connecting the areas.
The current bridge was completed in 1960 and named for Lemuel Tukey, a tavern owner and tax collector from the Back Cove area of Portland in the late 18th century. It replaced a bridge completed around 1898, and which carried the Portland and Yarmouth Electric Railway.

Further reading

 Dedication Program Interstate 95 : Tukey's Bridge, Portland, November 19, 1960

References

Bridges in Portland, Maine
Road bridges in Maine
Munjoy Hill
Bridges on the Interstate Highway System
Interstate 95
Bridges of the United States Numbered Highway System
U.S. Route 1